State Road 518 (NM 518) is a  state highway in northern New Mexico. NM 518 begins as a continuation of 7th Street at Mills Avenue near Interstate 25 (I-25) in Las Vegas. It proceeds north to La Cueva where the road turns northwest at its junction with NM 442. The road continues northwest through Mora and eventually ends in Ranchos de Taos at its northern terminus at NM 68. The segment of NM 518 between Mora and Ranchos de Taos passes through the rugged terrain of the Sangre de Cristo Mountains and provides access to Carson National Forest where camping, fishing, skiing, and other recreational opportunities are available.

Major intersections

See also

References

External links

518
Transportation in Mora County, New Mexico
Transportation in San Miguel County, New Mexico
Transportation in Taos County, New Mexico